Autódromo Internacional de Campo Grande  is a motorsports circuit located in Campo Grande, Brazil.
Till 2011 the circuit was one of the hosts of the South American Formula Three series, namely the Formula 3 Sudamericana.

Lap records

The official fastest lap records at the Autódromo Internacional de Campo Grande are listed as:

References

External links
Track information 1
Track information 2

de Campo Grande
Sports venues in Mato Grosso do Sul